The Viet Nam Democratic Socialist Party was a political party in South Vietnam.

History
It was founded in 1944 by Huỳnh Phú Sổ, the founder of Hòa Hảo.

The party was formed through the unity of a sector of socialist-minded people in Saigon and some provincial sect leaders. The party was persecuted by the Việt Minh. Huỳnh Phú Sổ was killed by the Việt Minh in 1947, after which the party was dissolved.

In February 1955, General Nguyễn Giác Ngộ of Hòa Hảo claimed that the party had been revived. The party obtained three seats in the 1959 National Assembly election.

See also

 Vietnam National Restoration League
 National Social Democratic Front

References

1944 establishments in Vietnam
Defunct political parties in Vietnam
Defunct socialist parties in Asia
Political parties established in 1944
Socialist parties in Vietnam